David Joseph Bonnar (born February 5, 1962) is an American bishop of the Catholic Church.  He is the Bishop of Youngstown, having been appointed to the position in 2020.  Before becoming a bishop, he was the editor of a magazine called The Priest and chaplain of the Pittsburgh Steelers.

Early life
Bonnar was born in Pittsburgh, Pennsylvania, on February 5, 1962.  His father worked as a butcher, while his mother was a housewife; he was the fourth of five children.  He studied at Duquesne University in Pittsburgh, obtaining a Bachelor of Arts degree in social communications in 1984.  Starting in 1984, he attended seminary at the Pontifical North American College in Rome.  He went on to obtain a Bachelor of Sacred Theology from the Pontifical Gregorian University in Rome.  On April 14, 1988, Bonnar was ordained to the diaconate at St. Peter's Basilica in Rome.  Three months later, on July 23, 1988, he was ordained to the Catholic priesthood at the Church of Saint Gabriel of the Sorrowful Virgin in Whitehall, which was his home parish.

Presbyteral ministry
Bonnar's first pastoral assignment was as parochial vicar of St. Vitus Parish in New Castle, Pennsylvania.  He was then transferred to St. Rosalia Parish in Greenfield, Pennsylvania, four years later.  He served as parish vicar of St. Thomas More Parish in Bethel Park, Pennsylvania, in 1996, before becoming director of vocations, rector of Saint Paul Seminary in Pittsburgh and director of the office for permanent deacons the following year.  He was appointed as pastor at St. Bernard Parish in Mt. Lebanon, Pennsylvania, in 2009, serving there for 11 years.  In July 2020, he was appointed the founding pastor of the new St. Aidan Parish in Wexford, Pennsylvania.

A spokesman for the diocese and fellow priest noted how Bonnar "has shown himself to be a wonderful spiritual leader and a very competent administrator".  Bonnar went into self-quarantine at the end of March 2020.  This was a precautionary measure after one priest in the city tested positive for the COVID-19 virus, while another developed mild symptoms. In addition to his duties as a parish priest, Bonnar served as the editor of The Priest magazine, a position he took in 2014.  He also worked as the chaplain of the Pittsburgh Steelers football team.

Episcopal ministry
Bonnar was appointed Bishop of Youngstown on November 17, 2020.  He received his episcopal consecration from Dennis Schnurr on January 12, 2021, at St. Columba Cathedral in Youngstown.

See also

 Catholic Church hierarchy
 Catholic Church in the United States
 Historical list of the Catholic bishops of the United States
 List of Catholic bishops of the United States
 Lists of patriarchs, archbishops, and bishops

References

External links
Roman Catholic Diocese of Youngstown Official Website
Biography on the Roman Catholic Diocese of Pittsburgh website

 

1962 births
21st-century Roman Catholic bishops in the United States
American magazine editors
Duquesne University alumni
Living people
Pittsburgh Steelers personnel
Pontifical Gregorian University alumni
Pontifical North American College alumni
Religious leaders from Pittsburgh
Bishops appointed by Pope Francis